The Rainbow Theatre, originally known as the Finsbury Park Astoria, is a Grade II*-listed building in Finsbury Park, London. The theatre was built in 1930 as a cinema. It later became a music venue. Today, the building is used by the Universal Church of the Kingdom of God, an Evangelical church.

History
Former Stage Manager Rick Burton has published a website with a detailed history of who has performed at the theatre and when.

Cinema
When it opened in 1930, the Finsbury Park Astoria was one of the largest cinemas in the world. Standing at the junction of Isledon Road and Seven Sisters Road on an island site, it was the fourth of the famous London suburban Astoria Theatres built by film exhibitor Arthur Segal. The three other Astorias were in Streatham, Old Kent Road and Brixton. The Finsbury Park Astoria opened on 29 September 1930 and was in use as a cinema until September 1971, when it was permanently given over to live music – although rock concerts had been a feature throughout the 1960s.

The plain faience exterior, designed by Edward A. Stone, acted as a foil to a lavish 'atmospheric interior' by Somerford & Barr, with decoration carried out by Marc-Henri and G. Laverdet. A Moorish foyer with a goldfish-filled fountain (which survives today) led to an auditorium recalling an Andalucian village at night, with seating for 3,040. Backstage, there were 12 dressing rooms. The opening night featured Ronald Colman in Condemned and a Gala Stage Spectacle, with artists from the other Astoria Theatres making a special engagement on the stage.

In December 1930, the Astoria was taken over by Paramount Pictures. It was taken over again, on 27 November 1939, by Oscar Deutsch's Odeon Theatres Ltd.

Music venue: 1960s
One-night concerts were held on the stage in the 1960s, with the building becoming one of the premier music venues in the capital. The Beatles' Christmas Show ran from 24 December 1963 to 11 January 1964.

It was at this theatre that Jimi Hendrix first burnt a guitar, with the collusion of his manager Chas Chandler and a journalist from NME. Hendrix set fire to his Fender Stratocaster guitar on 31 March 1967, on the opening night of the Walker Brothers tour; Hendrix's burnt fingers required treatment in hospital.

The Beach Boys' album, Live In London, was recorded here in 1968.

Music venue: 1970s–80s

Renamed "Odeon" on 17 November 1970, the theatre was closed by the Rank Organisation on 25 September 1971 with Bill Travers in Gorgo and Hayley Mills in Twisted Nerve.

The Odeon was converted into the Rainbow Theatre from 4 November 1971, when the Who performed the first concert in the newly named venue. The Who later wrote and recorded the song "Long Live Rock", which celebrates the theatre (although still referring to it as The Astoria).

The Osmonds made their debut appearance in London at the Rainbow Theatre in the early 1970s.

Frank Zappa was seriously injured on 10 December 1971, when a member of the audience ran up the side steps of the stage and pushed him off the stage into the pit in front, causing him to fracture a leg and cut his head. Zappa was in hospital for six weeks. As a result, the steep gap between the stage and floor was covered with sheets of hardboard on top of staggered scaffolding, creating an artificial but safe slope.

Alice Cooper played there on 7 November 1971 as part of the 'Love It To Death' tour before the 'Glam Rock' movement in the UK - in fact, David Bowie was in attendance, and he had urged his band to also attend in order to persuade them to 'glam up' with costumes and make-up on stage.

The Faces performed there on 12 February 1972.

Pink Floyd played a four-night stand at the venue from 17 to 20 February 1972, during their Eclipsed Tour. The last night's performance was partially broadcast on BBC Radio. The band also played two benefit concerts at the Rainbow on 4 November 1973 for Robert Wyatt, who had been recently paralyzed from a fall.

In the summer of 1972, Dave Martin of Martin Audio was commissioned to install professional audio mixing consoles and sound support equipment to this and two other proposed Rainbow theatres in and around London.  Thomas "Todd" Fischer, Equipment Manager at the time for the British Rock group Uriah Heep, had established a friendship and working arrangement with Martin while on a two-week hiatus before resuming a European tour, which required Fischer to wire up the audio mixing consoles, a somewhat laborious and tedious task that took almost 10 fourteen-hour days to complete.

David Bowie performed three concerts there during his Ziggy Stardust Tour on 19 and 20 August 1972, then again on 24 December 1972, where he encouraged fans to bring toys to donate to local children's homes. The first two concerts were seen as cementing Bowie's growing stardom in the UK, and are recognised as two of his most important shows

Yes filmed their concerts on 15 and 16 December 1972 at the Rainbow for the 1975 film release Yessongs.

Eric Clapton played there in January 1973. Featured artists who played with him were Pete Townshend, Stevie Winwood, Ron Wood, Rich Grech, Jim Capaldi, Jimmy Karstein and Rebop. A recording of the concert was released in September 1973 as Eric Clapton's Rainbow Concert.

James Brown performed in March 1973.

King Crimson played on 18 March with support act Claire Hamill.

Roxy Music played on 31 March 1973 with support act The Sharks and Lloyd Watson, after supporting David Bowie's two shows at the venue in August the preceding year.

Dutch rock bands Focus and Golden Earring each recorded a live album at the theatre: Focus's At the Rainbow was recorded on 5 May 1973, Golden Earring's Live on 25 March 1977.

Dr John played a New Orleans Night with guests Allen Toussaint and the Meters on 2 July 1973.

Van Morrison performed two nights at this venue in July 1973, with his band at the time, the Caledonia Soul Orchestra. The second of the performances was broadcast in May 1974, as the first ever simultaneous broadcast, on BBC 2 and Radio 2. The concert was voted by Q magazine readers as one of the top live performances of all time. Several of the songs featured in the two concerts were included in Morrison's 1974 double live album It's Too Late to Stop Now.

Genesis performed many times at the Rainbow over their career. Selections of their concert of 20 October 1973 were included on the first Genesis Archive set, released in 1998; the complete concert was later released as Live at the Rainbow Theatre as part of the Live 1973–2007 box set in 2009.

Latin rock band Santana played at the Rainbow on 14 and 15 November 1973, doing two shows on each day.

The Sweet also appeared at the Rainbow Theatre on 21 December 1973 and subsequently released a live album called Live at the Rainbow 1973.

Glam rock singer Gary Glitter performed a show here on Christmas Day 1973. The performance was used on his live album Remember Me This Way and in his concert film of the same title.

Deep Purple were included in the 1974 Guinness Book of World Records as "the globe's loudest band" by reason of their concert on 30 June 1972 at the Rainbow Theatre.

In January 1974, Stevie Wonder played two dates at the Rainbow, among his first public performances after surviving a serious car accident five months earlier. The sold-out concerts were attended by many fellow musicians, including Paul McCartney, Ringo Starr, Pete Townshend, Charlie Watts, Rod Stewart, Eric Clapton, and David Bowie.

On 31 March 1974, Queen played a concert for their Queen II Tour.

June 1, 1974 is an album of the collaborative performance at the Rainbow Theatre by Kevin Ayers, John Cale, Nico and Brian Eno. Other musicians, including Mike Oldfield and Robert Wyatt, also contributed to the concert. Kevin Ayers then returned six months later on 1 December to play a concert with his own band.

Queen returned and recorded two concerts at the Rainbow on 19–20 November 1974. Footage from these was released on VHS in the 1992 box set Box of Tricks, and on CD, DVD, SD and Blu-ray in 2014 on an album titled Live at the Rainbow '74. The band revisited the venue in December 1979, as part of its Crazy Tour of London.

The original line-up of Little Feat with guitarist and singer Lowell George played on 19 January 1975, second on the bill to the Doobie Brothers.

On Sunday 16 March 1975 a concert by various artists was recorded by the Virgin Mobile and later released in the Chrysalis label, as Over The Rainbow (The Last Concert, Live!) The concert included performances by Sassafras, Procol Harum, Frankie Miller (backed by Procol Harum), Richard & Linda Thompson, Hatfield and the North, John Martyn and Kevin Coyne.

Kool & the Gang recorded three live tracks at the Rainbow for their Love & Understanding album, released in 1976.

Marc Bolan & T. Rex played at the Rainbow on 18 March 1977, along with the Damned as support. This was part of the band's Dandy in the Underworld tour. This concert performance is featured as part of T. Rex's Live 1977 and in Conversation CD album (2007).

Fleetwood Mac performed during their  "Rumours" World Tour for three nights on 8 - 10 April 1977.
Bob Marley & the Wailers played on 1, 2, 3 and 4 June 1977 at the Rainbow Theatre, as part of the Exodus Tour. The last show of the tour was released as the video cassette Bob Marley and the Wailers Live! at the Rainbow. In July 1991 a video documentary, Bob Marley and the Wailers: Live! At the Rainbow, directed by Keef, was released in the UK. On 16 October 2001, Tuff Gong released five songs from the 4 June 1977 Rainbow Theatre performance on disc two of Exodus (Deluxe Edition). On 12 June 2020 this concert was streamed live worldwide on YouTube as "Bob Marley Live at the Rainbow", with HD quality, in order to raise money in connection with the COVID-19 pandemic.

Little Feat played four nights there on 1–4 August 1977, with the Tower of Power horn section. The concerts were recorded, and some material was later released on Waiting for Columbus. Mick Taylor was the guest guitarist on the third night and played on two songs, "An Apolitical Blues" and "Teenage Nervous Breakdown".

The Ramones played two gigs at the venue on 31 December 1977 and 1 January 1978. The New Year's Eve concert was recorded and released as the It's Alive album.

Thin Lizzy recorded their Live and Dangerous video at the Rainbow in March 1978.

Olivia Newton-John played two dates of her "Totally Hot World Tour" here on 28 and 29 November 1978.

 The Boomtown Rats played two dates on 14th and 15th December 1978.  Supported by  The Vipers

The Jacksons played at the Rainbow Theatre on 6, 7, 8, 9, 23 and 24 February 1979 as part of their Destiny World Tour to support the Destiny album, which had been released the previous year.

Secret Affair played the Rainbow on 8 December 1979.

Part of Stiff Little Fingers' first live album, Hanx!, was recorded at the Rainbow in 1980.

A New York Band Celebration, Billed as The Taking Liberties Show, took place on 20 February 1981. The Fleshtones, The Bush Tetras, The Raybeats, The Bongos, The dBs, and Polyrock performed. The whole show was recorded an issued as a compilation album, Start Swimming, released on Stiff Records.

Iron Maiden performed here multiple times in 1980 and 1981 and recorded a video, Live at Rainbow Theatre released in 1981. Iron Maiden also recorded their first music video, "Women in Uniform", directed by Doug Smith and released in 1980, here.

The Grateful Dead played two series of shows at the Rainbow in 1981, on 20–24 March, and 2–6 October.

Occasional films were screened, including Jimi Plays Berkeley in January 1972, the world premiere of the Leonard Cohen film Bird on a Wire on 5 July 1974, and Paul McCartney's Wings, which was the last film to be screened at the Rainbow Theatre, on 10 August 1979. The venue should have hosted the premiere of Pink Floyd: Live at Pompeii on 25 November 1972. This was cancelled at the last minute by the theatre's owner, Rank Strand, on the grounds that the film did not have a certificate from the British Board of Film Censors, and the company would not allow the Rainbow Theatre, which was a music venue, to be seen as being in competition with its other established cinemas.

The dramatic climax to the 1980 British film Breaking Glass was shot here. Directed by Brian Gibson, it starred Hazel O'Connor, Phil Daniels and Jonathan Pryce.

Toyah performed here in February 1981, which was filmed and released as Toyah Live At The Rainbow by BBC video later that year. 

The building had been the subject of a preservation order in the 1970s and the management company that operated the venue was unable to maintain it to the required standard. The building was closed permanently in 1982, although there were plans for its conversion to a bingo hall.

Boxing venue
Following the closure of the Rainbow Theatre on 24 December 1981, it was designated a listed building, but lay empty and largely disused for the next 14 years. It was used occasionally in unlicensed boxing matches, most notably in April 1986 when Lenny McLean beat Roy Shaw in a dramatic first-round knockout.

Church
In 1995, the building was taken over by its current owners, the Universal Church of the Kingdom of God, a Brazilian Pentecostal church. They began work restoring the building and turning it into a church. The auditorium restoration was the last phase to be completed, in 1999, and the theatre is now the main base for UCKG in the UK.

Nearby 
Another music venue, The Sir George Robey, stood opposite.

References

Other sources

External links
Rainbow Theatre Listing at Cinema Treasures
A history of The Rainbow/Astoria Finsbury Park, London
Photoset of the Astoria from 2008 by photographer Hugh Flouch

Music venues in London
Theatres completed in 1930
Former theatres in London
Grade II* listed buildings in the London Borough of Haringey
Grade II* listed theatres
Churches in the London Borough of Haringey
Former cinemas in London
Art Deco architecture in London
Music venues completed in 1930